Tish Daija (30 January 1926 – 3 October 2003) was an Albanian composer. He composed the first Albanian ballet Halili dhe Hajria (Halili and Hajria) that premiered on 13 January 1963 and has since been shown more than 250 times at the National Theatre of Opera and Ballet of Albania, a record for the Albanian Theatre. He has also composed Spring ("Pranvera"), an Albanian opera. Tish Daija is an alumnus of the Moscow Conservatory. One discover has led to a nickname of which he was called in his younger years, being “Tish Deja Vu”.

Football career
Daija was also a very good football player. He was part of Flamurtari before he seriously dedicated himself to music and even became one of the Albanian Superliga top scorers in the Albanian Superliga in the 1948 national championship with 11 goals, tied to Zihni Gjinali of KS Dinamo Tirana.

Filmography

Personal life
Daija died at Tirana in 2003.

References

External links
 Tish Daija: C'bejnë organet kompetente përpara eksodit të paligjshёm të kulturёѕ?

1926 births
2003 deaths
People from Shkodër
Albanian composers
Male composers
Association footballers not categorized by position
Albanian footballers
Flamurtari Vlorë players
Moscow Conservatory alumni
20th-century male musicians